Belo may refer to:

Organizations
 Belo Corporation, a United States media company now part of Gannett
 A. H. Belo Corporation, a media company in Dallas, Texas, United States now known as DallasNews Corporation

Places
 Belo, Cameroon, a town and commune in Cameroon
 Belo, Brda, a small settlement in the Littoral region of Slovenia
 Belo, Medvode, a small settlement in Medvode, Slovenia
 Belo, Šmarje pri Jelšah, a settlement near Šmarje, Slovenia
 Belo, West Virginia, an unincorporated community in Mingo County, West Virginia, USA
 Belo sur Mer, a town and commune in Madagascar
 Fajã do Belo, a permanent debris field on São Jorge, the Azores, Portugal
 Belo, Croatia, a village near Delnice

People
 Alfred Horatio Belo (1839–1901), founder of The Dallas Morning News newspaper
 Ana Paula Belo (born 1987), Brazilian handball playmaker
 António Mendes Belo (1842–1929), Portuguese cardinal
 , Brazilian singer, real name Marcelo Pires Vieira
 Brian Belo (born 1987), British entertainer
 Carlos Filipe Ximenes Belo (born 1948), Roman Catholic bishop who received, together with José Ramos-Horta, the 1996 Nobel Peace Prize
 Felipe dal Belo (born 1984), Brazilian football defender
 João Pedro Belo (1910–?), Portuguese football defender
 Julia Freitas Belo (born 1997), East Timorese football forward
 Mac Belo (born 1993), Filipino basketball player
 Mahalia Belo, British director
 Roseli de Belo (born 1969), Brazilian football forward
 Ruy Belo (1933–1978), Portuguese poet and essayist
 Sergei Belo (born 1970), 2011 coach for the Israel men's national ice hockey team
 Vicki Belo (born 1956), Filipino cosmetic surgeon
 BélO (Jean Bélony Murat, born 1979), Haitian musician
 Belo Cipriani (born 1980), American writer
 Belo Zero (born 1972), American rapper

Other
 Alfred Horatio Belo House, a historic mansion in Dallas, Texas, USA
 Belo Garden Park, a public park in Dallas, Texas, USA
 João Belo-class frigate, a class of ships for the Portuguese navy

See also 
 Belo Horizonte, a city in Brazil